Lamin is a type of structural protein in the cell nucleus.

Lamin may also refer to:

Lamin (given name)
Lamin (surname)
Lamin, North Bank Division, Gambia
Lamin, Western Division, Gambia
Lamin House, in Indonesia